Foresters Park is a sports ground and former greyhound racing track in Tranent, East Lothian, Scotland.

Facilities include two floodlit training areas, a 3G pitch and climbing wall. The sports ground is administered by East Lothian Council.

The Tranent greyhound track was built around the football ground at Foresters Park in 1936. The opening night for greyhound racing was 7 July 1936. and racing took place two evenings per week with the gate money being shared with the landlords, the Tranent Juniors F.C. The greyhound racing which was independent (unaffiliated to a governing body) ended in the mid-fifties.

References

Defunct greyhound racing venues in the United Kingdom
Greyhound racing in Scotland
Buildings and structures completed in 1936
Tranent
Sports venues in East Lothian